Westermark is a Swedish surname. Notable people with the surname include:

 Axel Westermark (1875–1911), American sailor
 Herbert Westermark (1891–1981), Swedish sailor
 Nils Westermark (1892–1980), Swedish sailor and radiologist

See also 
 Westermark sign, in chest radiography
 Edvard Westermarck (1862–1939), Finnish philosopher and sociologist
 Westermarck effect

Swedish-language surnames